Höttges is a surname. Notable people with the surname include:

Horst-Dieter Höttges (born 1943), German footballer 
Timotheus Höttges (born 1962), German businessman

German-language surnames